Schoenhof may refer to:

 Krásný Dvůr (Schönhof in German), Czech Republic
 Schoenhof's Foreign Books, a bookstore in Boston

People 
 Carl Schoenhof (1843–1911), American bookseller and publisher